Hess Mountain, also known as Mount Hess, is an  elevation glaciated summit located on the crest of the Alaska Range, in Alaska, United States. It is the seventh-highest peak in the Hayes Range, a subset of the Alaska Range. Mount Deborah, the nearest higher neighbor, is positioned  to the west. The mountain's name was reported in 1912 by the United States Geological Survey. The first ascent was made May 24, 1951, by Alston Paige, Dick Holdren, Ed Huizer, Howard Bowman, and Elton Thayer. The first ascent via the North Ridge was made May 23, 1976, by Steven Hackett and Thomas Hillis.

Climate

Based on the Köppen climate classification, Hess Mountain is located in a subarctic climate zone with long, cold, snowy winters, and mild summers. Temperatures can drop below −20 °C with wind chill factors below −30 °C. This climate supports the Gillam and West Fork Glaciers surrounding this peak. The months May through June offer the most favorable weather for climbing or viewing. Precipitation runoff from the mountain drains into tributaries of the Susitna and Tanana River drainage basins.

See also

List of the highest major summits of the United States
List of mountain peaks of Alaska
Geology of Alaska

References

External links
 Account of first ascent: American Alpine Club
 Weather forecast: Hess Mountain
 Hess Mountain: Flickr photo
 Luther Hess
 Luther and Harriet Hess

Alaska Range
Mountains of Denali Borough, Alaska
Mountains of Alaska
North American 3000 m summits